Stonehenge is an ancient stone monument in England.

Stonehenge may also refer to:

Places

Australia
 Stonehenge, New South Wales, a rural locality in Australia
 Stonehenge, Queensland (Barcoo Shire), a small outback township in Australia
 Stonehenge, Queensland (Toowoomba Region), a small township on the Darling Downs in Australia
 Stonehenge, Tasmania, a rural locality in Australia

United States
 Stonehenge (building), an apartment building in North Bergen, New Jersey
 Stonehenge (Dublin, New Hampshire), a summer estate house
 Stonehenge, Virginia, an unincorporated community
 America's Stonehenge, an archaeological site in New Hampshire
 Maryhill Stonehenge, a replica in Maryhill, Washington
 Stonehenge replica (Odessa, Texas), a 2004 replica of Stonehenge
 Stonehenge Tower, a radio antenna tower in Portland, Oregon

Elsewhere
 Stonehenge, Jamaica, a town in Jamaica
 Amazon Stonehenge, an archaeological site in northern Brazil
 Rural Municipality of Stonehenge No. 73, Saskatchewan, Canada
 Tiwanaku, a Pre-Columbian archaeological site in western Bolivia that includes what is sometimes called "Stonehenge of the Americas"

Arts, entertainment, and media

Music
 Stonehenge (Richie Havens album), 1970
 Stonehenge (Ruins album), 1990
 "Stonehenge", a song from the film This Is Spinal Tap
 "Stonehenge", a song on Brazilian band Fresno's album Quarto dos Livros
 "Stonehenge", a song by Norway's comedy duo Ylvis

Other uses in arts, entertainment, and media
 Stonehenge (game), an anthology board game
 Stonehenge (novel), a 1999 novel by Bernard Cornwell
 Stonehenge, a superweapon in Ace Combat 04, Ace Combat Infinity, and Ace Combat 7
 Stonehenge Free Festival, a former British free festival

Other uses
 Stonehenge, the pen name of the English sports and canine writer John Henry Walsh
 HMS Stonehenge (P232), an S class submarine of the Royal Navy
 Stonehenge Stakes, a horse race run at Salisbury Racecourse, England

See also
 Carhenge, a replica of Stonehenge built in 1987 from vintage automobiles
 Henge, a term for certain prehistoric architectural structures